Myx Music Awards 2016 is the 11th installment of the Myx Music Awards acknowledging the past year's biggest hitmakers in the Philippine music industry. For the fifth consecutive year, fans can vote online through Myx website.

Nominees were announced on February 9, 2016 starting at 6pm via MYX channel and live streaming. Leading the nominees were singers Bamboo, Darren Espanto, Nadine Lustre, and Julie Anne San Jose with five nominations each.

Winners and nominees
Winners are listed first and highlighted in boldface.

Multiple awards

Artist(s) with multiple wins
The following artist(s) received two or more awards:

Artist(s) with multiple nominations
The following artist(s) received more than two nominations:

References

External links
 Myx official site

Myx Music Awards
2016 music awards
Philippine music awards
Myx